Jeffrey Lee Harrigian (born 1962) is a  retired United States Air Force general who last served as the commander of United States Air Forces in Europe and Air Forces Africa from May 2020 to June 2022. He concurrently served as the commander of Allied Air Command and director of the Joint Air Power Competence Center. He previously served as deputy commander and as commander of United States Air Forces Central Command. Raised in Sparks, Nevada, he graduated from the United States Air Force Academy with a degree in International Affairs and was commissioned in 1985. He assumed his capstone assignment on May 1, 2019.

Personal life
Harrigian is of Armenian descent. Responding to a query about his Armenian heritage, Harrigian wrote: "My grandparents on my Dad's side came from the Yerevan area in Armenia." He also mentioned that he "grew up eating Armenian food almost every weekend in my Dad's parents' house”.

Military career

Harrigian was commissioned in 1985 as a graduate of the United States Air Force Academy. He has served in a variety of flying and staff assignments, including Deputy Director for Strategy, Plans and Assessments, United States Forces-Iraq, in support of Operation Iraqi Freedom and as Chief of the Joint Exercise Division at NATO's Joint Warfare Center, Stavanger, Norway. He has commanded at the flight, squadron and wing levels. He has flown combat missions in support of operations Just Cause, Desert Storm and Inherent Resolve. He served as Deputy Director of Operations (J3) at United States Central Command, MacDill Air Force Base, Florida. He also served as Director, F-35 Integration Office, Headquarters U.S. Air Force, the Pentagon, Arlington, Virginia. He is a command pilot with more than 4,100 hours in the F-22, F-15C, A/OA-37 and MQ-1.

Harrigian was Commander, United States Air Forces Central Command, Combined Force Air Component Commander United States Central Command, Southwest Asia, from 2016 to 2018. He was then appointed as the Deputy Commander, United States Air Forces in Europe-Air Forces Africa, Ramstein Air Base, Germany. As the air component to United States European Command and U.S. Africa Command, USAFE-AFAFRICA is responsible for providing full-spectrum warfighting capabilities to both combatant commanders throughout their area of responsibility, which encompasses 104 countries in Europe, Africa, Asia and the Middle East, the Arctic and Atlantic oceans and possesses more than a quarter of the world's population and world's gross domestic product.

On 25 March 2019, Harrigian was nominated for promotion to general and assignment as commander of United States Air Forces in Europe – Air Forces Africa and director of the Joint Air Power Competence Center.

Education

1985 Bachelor's degree in political science, U.S. Air Force Academy, Colorado Springs, Colo.
1993 Squadron Officer School, Maxwell Air Force Base, Ala., by correspondence
1995 U.S. Air Force Fighter Weapons Instructor Course, Nellis Air Force Base, Nev.
1999 Army Command and General Staff College, Fort Leavenworth, Kan.
2002 Air War College, Maxwell AFB, Ala., by correspondence
2005 Air Force Fellow, George C. Marshall European Center for Security Studies, Garmisch-Partenkirchen, Germany
2008 Enterprise Leadership Seminar, University of North Carolina at Chapel Hill
2008 Phase II, Joint Professional Military Education, Joint Forces Staff College, Norfolk, Va.
2011 Joint Force Air Component Commander Course, Maxwell AFB, Ala.
2012 Joint Flag Officer Warfighting Course, Maxwell AFB, Ala.
2015 Combined/Joint Force Special Operations Component Commanders Course, MacDill AFB, Fla.
2017 Pinnacle Course, National Defense University, Fort Lesley J. McNair, Washington, D.C.
2018 Leadership at the Peak, Arosa, Switzerland

Assignments

1. July 1985 – August 1986, Student, Undergraduate Pilot Training, Williams Air Force Base, Ariz.
2. April 1987 – January 1990, A/AO-37 Air Liaison Officer, forward air controller instructor pilot, and standardization and evaluation pilot, 24th Tactical Air Support Squadron, Howard AFB, Panama
3. March 1990 – September 1990, Student, F-15 replacement training, 555th Tactical Fighter Squadron, Luke AFB, Ariz.
4. September 1990 – June 1992, Squadron Life Support Officer, Chief, Squadron Scheduling, 8th Tactical Fighter Squadron, Holloman AFB, N.M.
5. July 1992 – June 1995, Chief, Squadron Scheduling, 1st Tactical Fighter Squadron, and Academic Instructor, Multi-stage Improvement Program, 325th Training Squadron, Tyndall AFB, Fla.
6. July 1995 – December 1995, Student, U.S. Air Force Weapons Instructor Course, Nellis AFB, Nev.
7. January 1996 – June 1998, Chief, Weapons and Tactic, 58th Fighter Squadron, and Chief, Wing, Weapons, 33rd Operational Support Squadron, Eglin AFB, Fla.
8. June 1998 – June 1999, Student, Army Command and General Staff College, Fort Leavenworth, Kan.
9. June 1999 – August 1999, Student, F-15 requalification training, Tyndall AFB, Fla.
10. August 1999 – January 2000, instructor pilot, F-15 Division; and Chief, Advanced Programs, Director of Tactics, U.S. Air Force Weapons School, Nellis AFB, Nev.
11. January 2000 – May 2001, Operations Officer, F-15 Division, U.S. Air Force Weapons School, Nellis AFB, Nev.
12. May 2001 – October 2002, Operations Officer, 95th Fighter Squadron, Tyndall AFB, Fla.
13. October 2002 – December 2004, Commander, 43rd Fighter Squadron, Tyndall AFB, Fla.
14. December 2004 – August 2005, Air Force Fellow, George C. Marshall European Center for Security Studies, Garmisch-Partenkirchen, Germany
15. August 2005 – June 2007, Chief, Joint Exercise Division, NATO's Joint Warfare Center, Stavanger, Norway
16. June 2007 – January 2008, Vice Commander, 1st Fighter Wing, Langley AFB, Va.
17. January 2008 – June 2010, Commander, 49th Fighter Wing, Holloman AFB, N.M.
18. July 2010 – July 2011, Deputy Director for Strategy, Plans and Assessment (J5), U.S. Forces-Iraq, Baghdad, Iraq
19. August 2011 – January 2013, Assistant Deputy Commander, U.S. Air Forces Central Command, and Assistant Vice Commander, 9th Air Expeditionary Task Force, Shaw AFB, S.C.
20. February 2013 – July 2014, Deputy Director, Operations (J3), U.S. Central Command, Mac Dill AFB, Fla.
21. August 2014 – April 2015, Assistant Deputy Chief of Staff for Operations, Headquarters U.S. Air Force, the Pentagon, Arlington, Va.
22. April 2015 – July 2016, Director, F-35 Integration Office, Headquarters U.S. Air Force, the Pentagon, Arlington, Va.
23. July 2016 – August 2018, Commander, U.S. Air Forces Central Command, Combined Force Air Component Commander, U.S. Central Command, Southwest Asia.
24. September 2018 – April 2019, Deputy Commander, U.S. Air Forces in Europe-Air Forces Africa, Ramstein AB, Germany
25. May 2019 – June 2022, Commander, United States Air Forces Europe; Commander, United States Air Forces Africa; Commander, Allied Air Command; and Director, Joint Air Power Competence Centre, Ramstein AB, Germany

Flight information
Rating: Command pilot
Flight hours: More than 4,100.
Aircraft flown: F-22, F-15C, A/OA-37 and MQ-1.

Awards and decorations

Effective dates of promotion

Other achievements
1986 Distinguished Graduate, Undergraduate Pilot Training
1989 O/A-37 Instructor Pilot of the Year, Tactical Air Command
1995 Outstanding Graduate, U.S. Air Force Weapons School
1996 Air Force Anthony C. Shine Award
1997 Safety Award of Distinction, Air Combat Command
1998 Ten Outstanding Young Americans Award, Air Combat Command
1998 Instructor Pilot of the Year, 33rd Fighter Wing

Publication
"Fighting the Fulcrum," Fighter Weapons Review and AFTTP 3–1, Vol. 4.

References

1962 births
Living people
People from Sparks, Nevada
United States Air Force Academy alumni
Embry–Riddle Aeronautical University alumni
Recipients of the Air Force Distinguished Service Medal
Recipients of the Defense Superior Service Medal
Recipients of the Legion of Merit
United States Air Force generals
American people of Armenian descent